Vendiamorpha is a class of extinct animals within the Ediacaran phylum Proarticulata.

The typical vendiamorph had an oval-shaped or round-shaped body divided completely into segmented isomers, that were arranged alternately in two rows with reference to the longitudinal axis of the body.

Description

The phenomenon of left-right alternating segments is called glide reflection symmetry, and is a diagnostic feature of proarticulatans. Transverse elements decrease in size from one end to the other and are inclined in the same direction. The larger isomers cover the smaller ones externally and the first isomer is much larger than the rest.

Typically, the first few, or largest isomers are fused together to form a headshield-like structure, leading some researchers to have originally considered them to be ancestral or related to arthropods, though, overwhelming evidence of them being proarticulatans have since led researchers to discard this hypothetical relationship.

Some vendiamorphs (e.g., Vendia and Paravendia) supposedly demonstrate a digestive-distributive system consisting of a simple axial tube and lateral appendages, with one lateral appendage corresponding to one isomer.

Class Vendiamorpha currently includes only one Family Vendiidae (originally referred to as Vendomiidae as the type genus Vendomia, before V. menneri was redescribed as a member of Dickinsonia) that consist of species Vendia sokolovi, V. rachiata, Paravendia janae and possibly Karakhtia nessovi, from Ediacaran (Vendian) rocks of the Arkhangelsk Region in Russia.

Name
The clade name Pseudovendia refers to the resemblances to a fossil imprint described as Vendia sokolovi. Originally, that fossil was interpreted as an arthropod, later as a proarticulatan, then conjectured as possibly a frond-like organism.

Current scientific consensus now recognizes the poorly preserved holotype of Pseudovendia as a pseudofossil.

See also
 List of Ediacaran genera

References

External links
 

 
Prehistoric animal classes